Hap and Leonard is an American drama television series based on the characters Hap and Leonard, created by novelist Joe R. Lansdale and adapted from his series of novels of the same name. The series was written and developed by Nick Damici and Jim Mickle, who had previously adapted Lansdale's Cold in July and was directed by Mickle. The series premiered on the American cable network SundanceTV on March 2, 2016. The series received favorable reviews.

The series was renewed for a final six-episode third season which premiered on March 7, 2018. The third season was inspired by the third novel in the Hap and Leonard series, titled The Two-Bear Mambo.

On May 14, 2018, SundanceTV announced they had cancelled the series after three seasons.

Cast and characters

Main 
 James Purefoy as Hap Collins, a white working class laborer who spent time in federal prison as a young man for refusing to be drafted into the military and serve in the Vietnam War
 Michael Kenneth Williams as Leonard Pine, a gay black Vietnam vet with serious anger issues
 Jimmi Simpson as Soldier, a local drug dealer (season 1)
 Bill Sage as Howard (season 1)
 Christina Hendricks as Trudy Fawst, Hap's ex-wife (season 1)
 Pollyanna McIntosh as Angel (season 1)
 Enrique Murciano as Raoul Vasquez (seasons 1–2)
 Tiffany Mack as Florida Grange (seasons 2–3)
 Cranston Johnson as Detective Marvin Hanson (seasons 2–3)
 Brian Dennehy as Sheriff Valentine Otis (season 2)
 Andrew Dice Clay as Sonny Knox (season 3)

Recurring 
 Neil Sandilands as Paco (season 1)
 Ron Roggé as Bud Collins
 Trace Masters as Little Hap
 Kaden Washington Lewis as Little Leonard
 Florence Young as Kay
 Kari Shemwell as Trudy Double
 Douglas M. Griffin as Charlie Blank
 Evan Gamble as Sneed
 Corbin Bernsen as Chief Cantuck
 Louis Gossett Jr. as Bacon (season 3)
 Laura Allen as Officer Reynolds
 John McConnell as Beau Otis
 Pat Healy as Truman Brown
 Jeff Pope as Chub

Production 
Filming of the show took place in Baton Rouge, Louisiana, although the series is set in 1980s in the fictional town of LaBorde in East Texas. Two of the locations used were the old Woman's Hospital  and the Celtic Media Centre.

Episodes

Season 1 (2016)
The first season is inspired by Savage Season. The second episode "The Bottoms" was released online on March 2, 2016, a week before its scheduled airing.

Season 2 (2017)
The second season is inspired by Mucho Mojo.

Season 3 (2018)
The third season is inspired by The Two-Bear Mambo. The second episode, "Ho-Ho Mambo" was released online at AMC.com and Sundancetv.com a week before the scheduled March 14 on-air premiere.

Reception 
On Rotten Tomatoes season 1 has an approval rating of 88% based on reviews from 24 critics.

Tie-in 
A collection called Hap and Leonard made up of previously published short stories (Hyenas, Veil’s Visit, Dead Aim) by Joe Lansdale as well as new content was published by Tachyon Publications in March 2016 as a tie-in to the TV series.

References

External links
 
 
 
 Joe R. Lansdale official website

2016 American television series debuts
2018 American television series endings
2010s American crime drama television series
2010s American LGBT-related drama television series
American crime comedy television series
English-language television shows
Gay-related television shows
Sundance TV original programming
Television shows based on American novels
Television shows filmed in Louisiana
Television shows set in Texas
Television series set in the 1980s